Irving Park is an 'L' station on the CTA's Blue Line. The station is located in the median of the Kennedy Expressway in the Irving Park neighborhood, though it draws its name from its cross street. Irving Park is one of two stations on the Blue Line that stops in an expressway median where the entrance is below the platform; Rosemont is the other, specifically beneath the westbound lane of the Kennedy Expressway. The station opened in 1970 as a part of the Kennedy extension of the Milwaukee Elevated from Logan Square to Jefferson Park.

History
The Irving Park station opened under the Kennedy extension of the Blue Line to Jefferson Park in 1970. Built as other nearby stations, according to the plans of architects Skidmore, Owings & Merrill, Irving Park is different; it does not pass under the crossing of the Kennedy Expressway and streets but it spans up to Irving Park Road and Pulaski Road.  This means that the main entrance is located under the tracks and not above as in other stations located in the median of the Kennedy Expressway. The layout of the station is also distinguished by the length of its banks, it can accommodate 10-car trains as opposed to the 8 of the other stations in the plan. This is explained by the presence of an auxiliary entrance on Pulaski Road.

On February 10, 1998, the Chicago Transit Authority temporarily closed the entrance on Pulaski Road. It reopened in October 1998 with the agent replaced with an ATM.

Bus and rail connections
Metra
 Union Pacific/Northwest Line

CTA

  53 Pulaski (Owl Service) 
  54A North Cicero/Skokie Blvd (Weekday Rush Hours only) 
  80 Irving Park

Notes and references

Notes

References

External links

Irving Park (O'Hare Line) Station Page
Pulaski Road entrance from Google Maps Street View
Irving Park Road entrance from Google Maps Street View

CTA Blue Line stations
Railway stations in the United States opened in 1970